The Westuit Nr. 7, also called the Koggemolen, is a windmill on the Kolkweg in Aartswoud, Netherlands that has been restored to working order. It is listed as a Rijksmonument, number 31787. The mill is to the south of the Westfriesedijk (part of the Westfriese Omringdijk) just outside Aartswoud. It is owned by Stichting de Westfriese Molens.

History
The mill is probably the oldest of its type in North Holland, dating to c. 1541. In 1869, a steam-powered pumping station was built in Medemblik. It drove two Archimedes' screws and two scoopwheels. These were replaced by centrifugal pumps in 1897. Following the replacement of the steam engines by gas engines in 1908, it was decided to abandon the use of wind power in the area. Two of the mills were converted to residential use, and the others were demolished. One of the two conversions was later demolished, leaving Westuit Nr. 7 as the sole survivor. 

In 1990, it was decided that the mill should be restored. By 1997, it had been restored externally and was able to turn in the wind. Restoration of the internal machinery was completed in 2009, and the mill was again able to pump water. This is done on a closed-circuit basis. The mill is listed as a Rijksmonument, No. 31787.

Description

Westuit Nr. 7 is a three-story smock mill on a single-story base. The smock and cap are thatched. The cap carries four common sails of  span. They are carried on a cast iron windshaft, which was cast in 1875 by De Prins van Oranje, The Hague. Winding is by an internal winch. The mill drives a wooden Archimedes' screw.

References

Windmills in North Holland
Rijksmonuments in North Holland
Opmeer
Smock mills in the Netherlands
Octagonal buildings in the Netherlands